Soukanh Mahalath (7 June 1954 – 17 May 2014) was a Laotian politician and member of the Lao People's Revolutionary Party. Mahalath was the Mayor of Vientiane, the country's capital city, until his death in May 2014. He had previously held the positions of Minister of Finance from 2001 to 2003 and the governor of the Bank of the Lao P.D.R., the country's central bank, from 1999 until 2001.

Soukanh Mahalath was killed in the Lao People's Liberation Army Air Force An-74 plane  crash on 17 May 2014.

References

1954 births
2014 deaths
Finance Ministers of Laos
Governors of the Bank of the Lao P.D.R.
Members of the 6th Central Committee of the Lao People's Revolutionary Party
Members of the 7th Central Committee of the Lao People's Revolutionary Party
Members of the 8th Central Committee of the Lao People's Revolutionary Party
Members of the 9th Central Committee of the Lao People's Revolutionary Party
Members of the 9th Secretariat of the Lao People's Revolutionary Party
Lao People's Revolutionary Party politicians
Mayors of places in Laos